Helium dating may refer to the traditional uranium–thorium dating (abbreviated U–Th/He dating) or to a variety of He diffusion methods that utilize the mobility of He atoms to determine the thermal history of a rock. Helium diffusion experiments are often used to help interpret information retrieved from U–Th/He thermochronometric experiments. Kinematic parameters derived from He diffusion is done through estimating He diffusion over a range of temperatures. The use of density functional theory  helps in estimating energy barriers for He to overcome as it diffuses across various crystallographic directions. Discrepancies, however, between observed and predicted He diffusion rates is still a problem and likely stem from unresolved problems in crystal defects and radiation damage in natural grains as opposed to theoretical grains. Depending on the mineral analyzed there are different assumptions to be made on He mobility. For example, He diffusion in minerals such as zircon, rutile, and monazite have been shown to be strongly anisotropic.  

A relatively new dating method, tritium–helium dating has been developed for determining rates of oxygen utilization in the ocean.

4He/3He Thermochronometry
Traditional U–Th/He thermochronometry determines the temperature Tc that the analyzed sample had at a time in the past corresponding to the age given by its content of parent and daughter nuclides. More information, however, can be concluded about a mineral's thermal history if an analysis of the He distribution in-situ is performed. Similar to the argon–argon dating (which uses 40Ar and 39Ar isotopes) where 39Ar is a second non-radiogenically produced isotope derived from 39K, each step-heating release of 39Ar can be directly associated with a date. With Helium-3 (3He) production the 4He/3He evolution is interpreted to provide an intragranular Helium-4 (4He) distribution. This method is superior in two ways: diffusion kinetics for 4He can be precisely determined and the 4He distribution provides a continuous path in a time-temperature history s opposed to a single point in a bulk-grain date. 

More specifically, the 4He distribution in a grain is a function of the time-integrated internal production from parent nuclides, minus diffusion loss and alpha ejection. This is done in conjunction with the assumption that the model is a spherical grain and calculations correlate with a radial position within that sphere. These calculations also assume that diffusion is isotropic.

Use to support creationism
In 1997, the Institute of Creation Research began a research project, named "RATE" (Radioisotopes and the Age of The Earth), which aimed at determining the validity of scientifically-accepted radiometric dating. One paper published from this research project describes the perceived issues of uniformitarian (U–Th)/He dating. In this paper the commonly-accepted ingrowth-diffusion equation (as first published in 1998) is erroneously rewritten to confirm creationist belief that the Earth formed roughly 6000 years ago.
The assumptions made in the creationist arguments also neglect the sensitivity that He diffusion methods have in regard to temperature fluctuations over time – especially since the granodiorite analyzed in the study has very complex geologic and thermal history.

References

Radiometric dating